Charley Burley (September 6, 1917 – October 16, 1992) was an American boxer who fought as a welterweight and middleweight from 1936 to 1950. Archie Moore, the light-heavyweight champion who was defeated by Burley in a 1944 middleweight bout, was one of several fighters who called Burley the greatest fighter ever. Burley was the penultimate holder of both the World Colored Welterweight Championship and the World Colored Middleweight Championship.

Early life
He was born Charles Duane Burley in Bessemer, Pennsylvania on September 6, 1917 to a mixed-race couple: his father was a black coal miner and his mother a white Irish immigrant from County Cork.  Raised in Bessemer, the only son of seven children, the family moved to Pittsburgh when his father was killed in an industrial accident in 1925.

He began boxing at the  age of 12 at a Boys Club and, as a lightweight, won city, state and national junior boxing titles and a Golden Gloves junior title. As a welterweight, he won a Golden Gloves Senior and lost the 1936 National Senior Championship finals. That same year, he refused an invitation to participate in the Olympic trials due to his objection to the Nazi regime. He did accept an invitation to attend a scheduled 'Workers Games' to be held in Republican Spain as a protest to the 1936 Berlin Summer Olympics, but the games were cancelled by the outbreak of the Spanish Civil War.

Burley had also excelled at baseball. He reportedly was offered a contract by the Homestead Grays, the local Negro leagues franchise.

Pro boxing career

The 5'9 ½ Burley fought at weights between 145 and 162 lbs. He made his pro debut on September 29, 1936, fighting as a welterweight at 150¾ lbs., at Pittsburgh's Moose Temple. He knocked out George Liggins in the fourth round of a four-round bout.  Less than two years later, on August 22, 1938, Burley met the Cocoa Kid at Hickey Park in Millvale, Pennsylvania for the World Colored Welterweight Championship. He won a unanimous decision in the 15-round bout, knocking the Kid to the canvas three times and defeating him decisively, taking his title.

Burley did not defend that title, possibly as part of a strategy to win a shot at Henry Armstrong's World Welterweight title. He won the World Colored Middleweight Title in a ninth round technical knockout against Holman Williams at Victory Arena in New Orleans, Louisiana on 14 August 1942. In their rematch for the title two months later at the same venue, Williams won a 15-round decision. Jack Kincaid of the Times-Picayune reported that Burley had won nine rounds of the fight and had been the aggressor throughout.
			
Burley was never granted a world title shot by any of the world welterweight and world middleweight champions of his era and was avoided by many of the top white contenders.  Among the fighters who "ducked"  Burley were Hall of Famers Billy Conn (who fought Joe Louis for the heavyweight title), Frenchman Marcel Cerdan (who was supposed to face Burley in his American debut) and even Sugar Ray Robinson, considered by many boxing historians as the best pound-for-pound fighter of all time.

Of course, not everyone ducked the slick Pittsburgh warrior. Burley won two out of three matches against future welterweight champion Fritzie Zivic, defeated the great Archie Moore by decision, and easily defeated future NYSAC middleweight king Billy Soose. Burley also faced future heavyweight champion Ezzard Charles, but dropped two 10-round decisions to him (the bouts were contested within a five-week period, sandwiching a fight against Williams). Another notable Burley fight was the one against heavyweight J.D. Turner, who outweighed him by around 70 lbs. "Turner, face beaten to raw beefsteak in six rounds, failed to answer the bell for the seventh." (The Ring, June 1942).

Burley himself was never stopped in 98 bouts. He compiled a record of 83 wins (50 by knockout) against 12 losses and two draws with 1 "no contest". He also battled financial problems at times during his career (which is why he's thought to have lost some of the fights he did) and was forced to work as an aircraft mechanic and garbage man in order to earn enough money to live off.

Legacy
Burley's second fight with Oakland Billy Smith in 1946 is the only known boxing film for him that is known to exist. It shows a conservative counter-puncher taming a much larger opponent with relative ease.

Burley's former sparring partner A.J. "Blackie" Nelson offers this comparison: "I see a lot of Charley in this kid, Roy Jones Jr. Both had unorthodox styles, could hit you from any angle, both hard to hit. Charley jabbed more than Jones, if Jones would concentrate on boxing as Charley did, he would become an all-time great."

Eddie Futch, the great trainer, called Burley "the finest all-around fighter I ever saw."
 
Burley was named to the Ring Magazine's list of 100 greatest punchers of all time, elected to the Boxing Hall of Fame in 1983 and the International Boxing Hall of Fame in 1992.

Burley was ranked 39th on Ring Magazine's list of the 80 Best Fighters of the Last 80 Years.

An exhibit at the Western Pennsylvania Sports Museum at Pittsburgh's Senator Heinz History Center states that Burley was the model for the character Troy in August Wilson's play Fences.

Professional boxing record

See also
List of bare-knuckle boxers
Murderers' Row (Boxing)

External links

References

1917 births
1992 deaths
Bare-knuckle boxers
Welterweight boxers
World colored welterweight boxing champions
World colored middleweight boxing champions
Boxers from Pittsburgh
People from Lawrence County, Pennsylvania
International Boxing Hall of Fame inductees
American male boxers